Patrick Highland was an American soldier who fought in the American Civil War. Highland received his country's highest award for bravery during combat, the Medal of Honor. Highland's medal was won for his 'conspicuous gallantry as Color Bearer' in the assault on Fort Gregg during the Third Battle of Petersburg, in Virginia on April 2, 1865. He was honored with the award on May 12, 1865.

Highland was born in Tipperary, Ireland, and in February 1864 (at the age of 22) joined the US Army from Chicago. He mustered out with his regiment in July 1865.

Medal of Honor citation

See also
List of American Civil War Medal of Honor recipients: G–L

References

Year of birth unknown
Year of death unknown
American Civil War recipients of the Medal of Honor
Irish-born Medal of Honor recipients
Irish emigrants to the United States (before 1923)
Irish soldiers in the United States Army
People from County Tipperary
People of Illinois in the American Civil War
Union Army officers
United States Army Medal of Honor recipients